Quail Hollow Club is a country club and golf course in the southeastern United States, located in the Quail Hollow neighborhood in Charlotte, North Carolina. It is a private member club, founded by James J. Harris on April 13, 1959.

The club hosted the Kemper Open on the PGA Tour from 1969 through 1979, and the senior tour's PaineWebber Invitational from 1983 through 1989. The PGA Tour returned to Quail Hollow in 2003 with the Wachovia Championship, now the Wells Fargo Championship, which has been held every year since except 2020 when it was cancelled due to the Coronavirus Pandemic.  Additionally the club hosted the 2017 PGA Championship and that year the Wells Fargo was held at Eagle Point in Wilmington, North Carolina.  The club is also scheduled to host the PGA Championship for a second time in 2025

Quail Hollow was designed by golf course architect George Cobb who designed several golf courses, primarily in the southeastern United States. Opened in 1961, it underwent a series of improvements, including modifications of several holes by Arnold Palmer in 1986, and a redesign by Tom Fazio in 1997, 2003, and from 2014 to 2016 in preparation for the PGA Championship. The course is part of an extensive housing development.

For the event, the courses will be rerouted. The hole arrangement changes starting at the 8th hole. After the 8th hole, players will skip the 9th to 11th holes, and will then play the 12th hole, and continue. After the 18th hole, players will play holes 9-11. The realignment of the course was designed for match play to assure most matches will reach the 16th to 18th holes at the course, with the only possible ways to avoid the signature "Green Mile" is to win 7&6 or better.

Club history
 April 13, 1959 First meeting of founders
 June 3, 1961 Golf course opened
 September 14, 1967 Clubhouse opened
 June 1969 – 1979 Kemper Open
 September 1980 – 1989 World Seniors Invitational
 July 1985 Holes 3, 7, 9, and 17 modified by Arnold Palmer
 August 1993 Rock wall on 17 added
 August 1994 Rock wall on 7 added
 September 1997 Course reconstructed by Tom Fazio
 July 2000 Clubhouse renovated
 Spring 2001 Practice facility reconstructed
 May 2003 PGA Tour returns to Quail Hollow, David Toms wins inaugural Wachovia Championship
 Summer 2003 Holes 2, 8, 9 modified by Tom Fazio
 May 2004 Joey Sindelar wins second annual Wachovia Championship
 May 2005 Vijay Singh wins third annual Wachovia Championship
 May 2006 Jim Furyk wins fourth annual Wachovia Championship
 May 2007 Tiger Woods wins fifth annual Wachovia Championship
 May 2008 Anthony Kim wins sixth annual Wachovia Championship (first PGA Tour victory)
 May 2009 Sean O'Hair wins seventh annual Quail Hollow Championship
 May 2010 Rory McIlroy wins eighth annual Quail Hollow Championship (first PGA Tour victory)
 May 2011 Lucas Glover wins ninth annual Wells Fargo Championship
 May 2012 Rickie Fowler wins 10th annual Wells Fargo Championship (first PGA Tour victory)
 May 2013 Derek Ernst wins 11th annual Wells Fargo Championship (first PGA Tour victory)
 May 2014 J. B. Holmes wins 12th annual Wells Fargo Championship
 May 2015 Rory McIlroy wins 13th annual Wells Fargo Championship
 May 2016 James Hahn wins 14th annual Wells Fargo Championship
 Summer 2016 Tom Fazio creates a new 1st hole (par 4) by combining no. 1 (par 4) and no. 2 (par 3) and a new 4th (par 3) and 5th (par 4) hole by dividing no. 5 (par 5).  The course now plays as a par 71 for tournament golf but still a par 72 for members as no. 1 plays as a par 5 for members.
 August 2017 Justin Thomas wins the 99th PGA Championship
 May 2018 Jason Day wins 16th annual Wells Fargo Championship
 May 2019 Max Homa wins 17th annual Wells Fargo Championship (first PGA Tour victory)
 March 2020 18th annual Wells Fargo Championship cancelled due to the COVID-19 Pandemic, will resume in 2021 as previously scheduled
 April 2020 PGA of America announces the PGA Championship will return to the club in 2025
 May 2021 Rory Mcllroy wins 19th annual Wells Fargo Championship (third PGA Tour victory at Quail Hollow) 
 September 2022 President's Cup to be held.

References

Golf clubs and courses in North Carolina
Sports venues in Charlotte, North Carolina
Privately held companies based in North Carolina
1959 establishments in North Carolina